The 13th American Society of Cinematographers Awards were held on February 21, 1999, honoring the best cinematographers of film and television in 1998.

Winners

Film
 Outstanding Achievement in Cinematography – Theatrical Releases
 The Thin Red Line – John Toll

Television
 Outstanding Achievement in Cinematography – Regular Series
 The X-Files (Episode: "Drive") – Bill Roe

Nominees

Film
 Outstanding Achievement in Cinematography – Theatrical Releases
 Elizabeth – Remi Adefarasin
 The Horse Whisperer – Robert Richardson
 Saving Private Ryan – Janusz Kamiński
 Shakespeare in Love – Richard Greatrex

Television
 Outstanding Achievement in Cinematography – Regular Series
 JAG (Episode: "Gypsy Eyes") – Hugo Cortina
 Michael Hayes (Episode: "Imagine") – James L. Carter
 Millennium (Episode: "Skull and Bones") – Robert McLachlan
 The X-Files (Episode: "Travelers") – Joel Ransom

References

American Society of Cinematographers Awards
1998 film awards
1998 television awards
1998 in American cinema
1998 in American television
American